"Always the Pretenders" is a 2006 single released by the Swedish rock band Europe. It is the first single from Europe's album Secret Society, and was released on 11 October 2006. The single peaked at number 2 on the Swedish singles chart.

The song is co-written by vocalist Joey Tempest and bassist John Levén, and was inspired by a phonecall Tempest received on 11 September 2001.

Track listing
"Always the Pretenders" (Radio Edit)
"Always the Pretenders" (Album Version)
"Flames" (Live at B.B.King's, New York 2005)
"Superstitious" (Live at B.B.King's, New York 2005)

Personnel
Joey Tempest − vocals
John Norum − guitars
John Levén − bass guitar
Mic Michaeli − keyboards
Ian Haugland − drums

Charts

Weekly charts

Year-end charts

References 

2006 singles
Europe (band) songs
Songs written by Joey Tempest